On Tyranny: Twenty Lessons from the Twentieth Century is a 2017 book by Timothy Snyder,  a historian of 20th-century Europe. The book was published by Tim Duggan Books in hardcover and by Penguin Random House in paperback. A graphic version, illustrated by Nora Krug, was released October 5, 2021. The book topped the New York Times bestseller list for paperback nonfiction in 2017 and remained on bestseller lists as late as 2021.

On Tyranny focuses on the concept of tyranny in the context of the modern United States politics, analyzing what Snyder calls "America's turn towards authoritarianism". Explaining that "(h)istory does not repeat, but it does instruct," he analyzes recent European history to identify conditions that can enable established democracies to transform into dictatorships. The short (126 pages) book is presented as a series of twenty instructions on how to combat the rise of tyranny, such as "Defend institutions", "Remember professional ethics", and "Believe in truth".

Reviews

Carlos Lozada of The Washington Post describes the book as "clarifying and unnerving", "a memorable work that is grounded in history yet imbued with the fierce urgency of what now." Daniel W. Drezner, writing for The New York Times, says, "For such a small book, Snyder invests On Tyranny with considerable heft," but he also describes it as "overwrought" and tending toward hyperbole. 

Tim Adams of The Guardian describes the work as "a 'how to' guide for resisting tyranny", concluding "You will read no more relevant field guide to that wisdom than this book." Richard Evans, also in The Guardian, writes that "Snyder provokes us to think again about major issues of our time, as well as significant elements of the past, but he seems to have rushed it out rather too quickly."

References

2017 non-fiction books
Books about politics of the United States
English-language books
The Bodley Head books
Tim Duggan Books books